Dud Beattie (27 April 1934 – 19 April 2016) was an Australian rugby league footballer who played in the 1950s and 1960s. An Australian international and Queensland representative prop forward, he played in Ipswich, Queensland for the Railways club.

Career

Beattie along with Noel Kelly and Gary Parcell, helped Ipswich dominate the Bulimba Cup and all three were selected for the Australian national side's front row. In 1959 he played in the Queensland victory over New South Wales that attracted 35,261 spectators, smashing Brisbane's previous record for an interstate match of 22,817. Also that year Beattie was selected to make his international debut for Australia, becoming Kangaroo No. 338. He went on the 1959-60 Kangaroo tour of Great Britain and France, represented Australia at the 1960 World Cup, and went on the 1961 tour of New Zealand.

Beattie's last international was played during the 1962 Great Britain tour of Australia where he appeared in all three Tests. In the third Test at Sydney in July 1962 he dislocated his shoulder and played on knowing there were no substitutes allowed. When he eventually needed to leave the field, Beattie provoked Derek Turner into a fight, referee Darcy Lawler sent both men off and the opposing numbers remained even. Australia went on to snatch an 18-17 win. He retired with thirteen Test caps and two World Cup appearances.

Beattie later worked as a selector during the 1980s for the Australian national team and for the Ipswich Jets on the coaching and administration staff.

References

Sources
 Andrews, Malcolm (2006) The ABC of Rugby League Austn Broadcasting Corpn, Sydney

1934 births
2016 deaths
Australia national rugby league team players
Australian rugby league administrators
Australian rugby league coaches
Australian rugby league players
Queensland rugby league team players
Rugby league players from Ipswich, Queensland
Rugby league props